Edward Bennett (1862 – unknown) was an English footballer who played for Stoke.

Career
Bennett joined Stoke in 1883. He played in the club's first competitive match in the FA Cup which was against Manchester in a 2–1 defeat. He scored four goals in two cup matches during the 1886–87 season. He left the club at the end of 1887 and played for Leek Welfare.

Career statistics

References

English footballers
Stoke City F.C. players
1862 births
Year of death missing
Association football forwards